Letitia Alma Vriesde (born 5 October 1964) is a female former track and field athlete from Suriname, who specialised in the 800 metres but was also successful over 1500 metres. She is the first (and to date, only) sportsperson from Suriname to compete at five Olympic Games. She won a silver medal at the 1995 World Championships and a bronze medal at the 2001 World Championships. Vriesde holds the South American records for the 800 metres, 1000 metres and 1500 metres (indoors and outdoors) and also for the 3000 metres (indoors).

Career
Vriesde started running in Suriname, coached by Luiz de Oliveira. She left Suriname after failing to be selected for the 1984 Olympics to train in the Netherlands. In the Netherlands, Vriesde competed for Atletiekvereniging Rotterdam.

She competed in the 800 metres at the 1988 Summer Olympics, and broke into the highest echelons of the sport in 1991, when she reached the finals of both the 800 and 1500 metres at the IAAF World Championships in Athletics in Tokyo, finishing in fifth and ninth places respectively. At the 1992 Summer Olympics Vriesde set a record of sorts by recording the fastest ever non-qualifying time (1:58.28) in an 800 metres semi-final.

Vriesde won a bronze medal in the 800 metres at the 1995 IAAF World Indoor Championships, before going on to win a silver medal at the 1995 World Championships in Athletics behind Cuba's Ana Quirot. At both competitions, she became the first South American female athlete to win a medal.

A year later, she missed the finals at the 1996 Summer Olympics, running a nearly identical time to her 1992 Olympic performance (1:58.29), again placing fifth in her semifinal. Vriesde won a bronze medal in the 800 metres at the 2001 World Championships in Athletics behind Mozambique's Maria Mutola and Austria's Stephanie Graf. Throughout her career, Vriesde also won many medals at the Pan American Games, Central American and Caribbean Games and South American Games.

Vriesde was disqualified and stripped of her gold medal at the 2003 Pan American Games after testing positive for excessive caffeine levels. She was said to have the equivalent of five gallons of coffee in her system. She was not banned however and went on to compete at that year's World Championships. Drinking too much coffee or taking a common cold tablet would no longer get athletes disqualified after a new global list of banned substances was drawn up by the World Anti-Doping Agency and applied from 1 January 2004.

Vriesde retired soon after competing at her seventh World Championships in 2005. In Paramaribo a street formerly known as Cultuurtuinlaan was changed into Letitia Vriesdelaan. The Surinamese Government also gave her a piece of land in appreciation of her achievements.

Personal life
Vriesde married  Bas van Veen on 9 September 2005 in Middelburg, Holland. Her daughter Joi Vienna was born on 19 March 2007.

Personal bests
400 m 52.01 (1997)
800 m 1:56.68 (1995)
1000 m 2:32.25 (1991)
1500 m 4:05.67 (1991)
Mile 4:30.45 (1992)
3000 m 9:15.64 (1991)

As of 2017, Vriesde's 800m best of 1:56.68 ranks her 58th on the World all-time list.

Vriesde’s Top 10 800m performances
 1:56.68 AR 2 WCh Gothenburg 13.08.95
 
 
 1:57.07 3rA WK Zürich 16.08.95
 
 
 1:57.09 3 Her Monte Carlo 10.08.96
 
 
 1:57.16 4= GPF Monte Carlo 09.09.95
 
 
 1:57.35 3 WCh Edmonton 12.08.01
 
 
 1:57.86 4 Her Monte Carlo 16.08.97
 
 
 1:57.96 AR 5 APM Hengelo 28.06.92
 
 
 1:57.98 2 Nikaïa Nice 16.07.97
 
 
 1:58.11 2 ISTAF Berlin 01.09.95
 
 
 1:58.12 4 WCh Athens 09.08.97

World Rankings

Women's 800m
 1990 #26
 1991 #9
 1992 #9
 1993 #38
 1994 #72
 1995 #4
 1996 #8 
 1997 #4
 1998 #7
 1999 #9
 2000 #14
 2001 #4
 2002 #31
 2003 #44
 2004 #63

Women's 1500
 1990 #83
 1991 #17
Women's 400m
1997 #54

Olympic Games glossary

800 metres Event History
1988 Seoul     Round One     Heat 4  4th  2:01.83
1988 Seoul     Semi-Finals   Heat 2  8th  2:02.34	
1992 Barcelona Round One     Heat 3  2nd  1:59.93
1992 Barcelona Semi-Finals   Heat 1  5th  1:58.28
1996 Atlanta   Round One     Heat 1  2nd  1:59.71	
1996 Atlanta   Semi-Finals   Heat 2  5th  1:58.29	
2000 Sydney	Round One     Heat 2  4th  2:02.09	
2004 Athens    Round One     Heat 3  4th  2:01.70
2004 Athens    Semi-Finals   Heat 3  8th  2:06.95

1500 metres Event History
1988 Seoul	Round One     Heat 2  12th  4:19.58
1992 Barcelona Round One     Heat 2  5th   4:10.63
1992 Barcelona	Semi-Finals   Heat 1  8th   4:09.64

Competition record

1Representing the Americas

See also
List of sportspeople sanctioned for doping offences
List of athletes with the most appearances at Olympic Games

References

External links
Website of Letitia Vriesde (in Dutch)

1964 births
Living people
Doping cases in athletics
Surinamese female middle-distance runners
Surinamese steeplechase runners
Olympic athletes of Suriname
Surinamese sportspeople in doping cases
Athletes (track and field) at the 1991 Pan American Games
Athletes (track and field) at the 1995 Pan American Games
Athletes (track and field) at the 1999 Pan American Games
Athletes (track and field) at the 2003 Pan American Games
Athletes (track and field) at the 1988 Summer Olympics
Athletes (track and field) at the 1992 Summer Olympics
Athletes (track and field) at the 1996 Summer Olympics
Athletes (track and field) at the 2000 Summer Olympics
Athletes (track and field) at the 2004 Summer Olympics
People from Coronie District
Pan American Games gold medalists for Suriname
Pan American Games silver medalists for Suriname
Pan American Games bronze medalists for Suriname
Pan American Games medalists in athletics (track and field)
World Athletics Championships medalists
World Athletics Championships athletes for Suriname
Female steeplechase runners
Central American and Caribbean Games gold medalists for Suriname
Central American and Caribbean Games silver medalists for Suriname
Competitors at the 1990 Central American and Caribbean Games
Competitors at the 1993 Central American and Caribbean Games
Competitors at the 1998 Central American and Caribbean Games
Competitors at the 2002 Central American and Caribbean Games
South American Games gold medalists for Suriname
South American Games silver medalists for Suriname
South American Games medalists in athletics
Competitors at the 1990 South American Games
Competitors at the 1994 South American Games
Central American and Caribbean Games medalists in athletics
Medalists at the 1991 Pan American Games
Medalists at the 1995 Pan American Games
Medalists at the 1999 Pan American Games